Ádám Varga (born 12 February 1999) is a Hungarian football player who plays for Kecskemét on loan from Ferencváros.

Career

Ferencváros
Varga signed his first professional contract with Ferencváros on 22 June 2015.

Loan to Kecskemét
On 29 July 2022, Varga moved on a season-long loan to Kecskemét.

Honours

Ferencvárosi TC
OTP Bank Liga: 2015–16
Magyar Kupa: 2015–16
Magyar Szuperkupa: 2015

Club statistics

Updated to games played as of 15 May 2022.

References

External links
Fradi.hu
MLSZ

1999 births
Footballers from Budapest
21st-century Hungarian people
Living people
Hungarian footballers
Hungary youth international footballers
Hungary under-21 international footballers
Association football goalkeepers
Ferencvárosi TC footballers
Soroksár SC players
Kecskeméti TE players
Nemzeti Bajnokság I players
Nemzeti Bajnokság II players
Nemzeti Bajnokság III players